Paragordiidae is a family of worms belonging to the order Chordodea.

Genera:
 Digordius Kirjanova 1950
 Paragordius Camerano, 1897

References

Nematomorpha